Savyetski District is an administrative subdivision of the city of Minsk, Belarus. It was named after the Soviets.

Geography
The district, the smallest of the city, is situated in central and south-western area of the city and borders with Tsentralny, Pyershamayski and Partyzanski districts.

Transport
The district is served by the Maskoŭskaja subway line. It is also crossed by the MKAD beltway .

See also
Opera and Ballet Theatre of Belarus
National Academy of Sciences of Belarus

References

External links
 Savyetski District official website

Districts of Minsk